The Piazzale Flaminio railway station is a railway station in Rome (Italy) and the terminus of the Rome–Civitacastellana–Viterbo railway, managed by ATAC.

History 
The station was inaugurated on October 28 1932 (the tenth anniversary of the March on Rome) together with the Rome - Civita Castellana line; the last urban section was built in a tunnel under the quarter Parioli.

Description 
The station is located on the ground floor of a three-story building designed by the architect Ariodante Bassero. It has an underground hall about 100 meters long, with tracks on either side and a central sidewalk. In a room adjacent to the ticket office there is a fresco representing all the towns reached by the railway.

In addition to the suburban trains bound for Civita Castellana and Viterbo, urban trains also depart from the station, which terminate at the Montebello station.

Interchanges
  Metro stop (Flaminio - Piazza del Popolo, line A)
  Tram stop (Flaminio, line 2)
  Bus stop (ATAC and Cotral lines)

Notes

External links 
 

Railway stations in Rome